Today Is the Day (German: Heut' kommt's drauf an) is a 1933 German comedy film directed by Kurt Gerron and starring Hans Albers, Luise Rainer and Oskar Karlweis. It features a number of jazz interludes. The film's sets were designed by the art directors Max Knaake and Julius von Borsody.

It premiered at the Gloria-Palast in Berlin. It was shot between December 1932 and January 1933 during the final months of the Weimar Republic. Despite its popular success the incoming Propaganda Minister Joseph Goebbels described it as "terrible rubbish". Due to their Jewish background a number of those involved with the film, including the director Gerron and star Rainer, left Germany after the Nazi takeover.

Synopsis
Hannes Eckmann, the leader of a Hamburg jazz group heads for Berlin to take part in a competition. He encounters Marita Costa a leader of an all-female band and falls for her. After discovering she is short of a dancer for a performance he steps into the role and is a big success. However, when she discovers his real identity as a rival conductor she believes it is all part of an underhand scheme to sabotage her ahead of the big competition.

Cast
 Hans Albers as Hannes Eckmann
 Luise Rainer as 	Marita Costa
 Oskar Karlweis as Peter Schlemm
 Oskar Sima as Basil, Maritas Impresario
 Max Gülstorff as Generaldirektor Bourth
 Baby Gray as Anni, die 'Puppe'
 Weintraub Syncopators as Themselves
 Arthur Bergen		
 Teddy Bill		
 Albert Fischer	
 Max Grünberg		
 Mario Guido	
 Philipp Manning
 Hanna Maron
 Loni Michelis	
 Josef Peterhans
 Werner Pledath	
 Ludwig Trautmann	
 Nico Turoff 	
 Michael von Newlinsky

References

Bibliography 
 Bock, Hans-Michael & Bergfelder, Tim. The Concise Cinegraph: Encyclopaedia of German Cinema. Berghahn Books, 2009.
 Moeller, Felix. The Film Minister: Goebbels and the Cinema in the Third Reich. Edition Axel Menges, 2000.

External links 
 

1933 films
1933 comedy films
Films of the Weimar Republic
German comedy films
1930s German-language films
Films directed by Kurt Gerron
German black-and-white films
Films set in Hamburg
Films set in Berlin
Films shot in Berlin
1930s German films